Gomphidius pseudoflavipes is a mushroom in the family Gomphidiaceae that is found in California in North America.

References

External links

Boletales
Fungi described in 2003
Fungi of North America